Chionodes sabinianus is a moth in the family Gelechiidae. It is found in North America, where it has been recorded from southern British Columbia to California.

The larvae feed on Pinus sabiniana, Pinus coulteri, Pinus ponderosa, Pinus radiata and Abies concolor.

References

Chionodes
Moths described in 1959
Moths of North America